Ripon High School is a public high school located in Ripon, Wisconsin. The school serves students in grades 9 through 12, and has an enrollment of about 510 students as of the 2019-2020 school year. It is the only high school in the Ripon School District.

Sports 
Ripon High School's mascot is the Tiger.  The school has recently joined the Eastern Valley Conference after spending several years in the East Central Flyway Conference.  Sports facilities include Ingalls Field, which is shared with Ripon College. Ingalls Field has a capacity of 3500 and has FieldTurf installed on the field.

Ripon offers nine boys' varsity sports: football, soccer, cross country, basketball, wrestling, baseball, tennis, track, and golf, and seven girls' varsity sports: tennis, volleyball, cross country, basketball, soccer, softball, and track. 

Ripon's biggest rivals include the Waupun Warriors, the Omro Foxes, the Winneconne Wolves, and the Berlin Indians.

References

Public high schools in Wisconsin
Schools in Fond du Lac County, Wisconsin